Teretiopsis abyssalis is a species of sea snail, a marine gastropod mollusk in the family Raphitomidae.

Description
The length of the shell attains 14.3 mm, its diameter 9.2 mm.

Distribution
This marine species was found east of Japan at a depth of 5,510 m.

References

External links
  Kantor, Yu.I. & Sysoev, A.S. (1989) The morphology of toxoglossan gastropods lacking a radula, with a description of a new species and genus of Turridae. Journal of Molluscan Studies, 55, 537–550
 

abyssalis
Gastropods described in 1989